The Hope Division is a 1987 American television film.

Plot
A black cop teams up with a white cop to track down a serial killer.

Cast
Dorian Harewood
Mimi Kuzyk
Hattie Winston

References

External links

The Hope Division at BFI

1987 television films
1987 films
Films directed by Mel Damski